Namrata Singh Gujral (born February 26, 1976) is an American filmmaker, motivational speaker and actor.

Life and career
Gujral was born in Dharamshala, Himachal Pradesh, but left India at a young age. A devout Sikh by faith, she graduated in 1998 from the University of West Florida. She is a film producer, director and motivational speaker. She is also a former actress.

Gujral also serves as President of Uniglobe Entertainment, a Hollywood based studio, which focuses on socially relevant international projects for the North American market.

Gujral is a breast cancer survivor and blood cancer survivor. She attributes her medical journey to the dramatic shift in her life – a shift that has led her to choose entertainment projects that carry strong humanitarian angles.

Gujral is currently shooting Finding Match, a docu-drama on blood cancer, that traces the journey of humans from pre-historic times and the genetic changes that occurred, which make various ethnic groups more likely to find stem cell matches within their own communities.

Gujral is also wrapping production on  America's Forgotten 2 – a sequel to ‘America’s Forgotten’, a docu-drama on the American immigration system, which was shot in several countries. Newsweek released the trailer.

Gujral’s recent venture 5 Weddings, a Hollywood-Bollywood rom-com, features international stars Nargis Fakhri (Bollywood Blockbuster Rockstar), Rajkummar Rao (Bollywood Blockbuster Stree), Oscars nominee Candy Clark (American Graffiti) and Golden Globes nominee Bo Derek (10). Film opened theatrically in 54 countries this past October. Film delves into the lives of Hijras, a group of transgender dancers at Indian weddings, who are socially ostracized.

Lifetime TV honored Gujral as one of their “Remarkable Women” making her the first Indian-American to join the ranks of other notables such as Michelle Obama and Hillary Clinton. The honor was awarded for WB’s 1 a Minute starring Olivia Newton-John, Melissa Etheridge, Deepak Chopra, Lisa Ray, Mumtaz, Jaclyn Smith, Barbara Mori and Billy Baldwin.

Gujral’s first production Americanizing Shelley starring Beau Bridges and Wil Wheaton was released theatrically in 24 countries with Warner Bros. Film posted higher box office averages than Angelina Jolie’s ‘Changeling’ and Brad Pitt’s ‘The Curious Life of Benjamin Button’ in various territories including Dubai and South Africa.

Gujral also recently directed American Dream, a film starring Satya Bhabha (Deepa Mehta’s Midnight’s Children), Alex Veadov (Act Of Valor) and Omi Vaidya (Bollywood Blockbuster 3 Idiots). The film covered the challenges faced by new immigrants from the third world who migrate to developed countries.

Gujral’s upcoming projects include STILL (a sci-fi feature), currently in casting and Tie That Binds (a war based drama), currently in scripting which focuses on an international NATO mission in the Middle East.

Gujral has been recognized widely for her creative and commercial expertise on co-productions between Hollywood and Bollywood. She often lends her opinions at major networks like CNN, Fox and Times of India. Gujral has spoken on Hollywood-Bollywood co-productions at Stanford University, Nashville Film Fest, Melbourne Film Festival, Connecticut Film Fest and more.

Gujral was the first Indian-American invited by the late Bollywood stalwart Yash Chopra (Founder, Yash Raj Films) to speak on the dynamics of global co-productions at FICCI, India’s highly prestigious entertainment conference, held annually in Mumbai. Gujral has also served as Juror at film festivals and several Miss India-America pageants.

As part of a give back to the world cancer community, Gujral launched The Thrive Channel in June 2017. TTC is a media brand devoted to cancer survivors. Gujral developed the shows Destination Survival, Ultimate Survivor and Thrive with Namrata as a guidebook for cancer survivors to promote a good quality life after cancer treatments. Shows feature experts Dr. Dennis Slamon (Inventor, Herceptin), Dr. Debu Tripathy (MD Anderson) and Dr. Deanna Attai (President, American Society of Surgeons).

Gujral started in the industry as an actress – a career choice she gave up in 2008 after her first cancer diagnosis. As an actress, Gujral’s highlights include ‘Dancin’ In The Clouds, a first time “Country Rock” meets “Bollywood” duet with country music star Steve Azar (“Waitin’ on Joe” w/ Morgan Freeman), recurring role of “Fari Bin Ghori” on CBS’s “The Agency” produced by Wolfgang Petersen (“The Perfect Storm”) and a five-year stint, on NBC’s ‘Passions’ (2001-2005).
Gujral also essayed the role of Pakistani-American “Saira Ahmed” in CBS’s Family Law (for which Gujral, along with co-stars Tony Danza and Kathleen Quinlan, were Columbia Tristar’s official nomination for Emmy Awards 2002).

Health
In 2013, she was treated for Burkitt's lymphoma. She was treated with aggressive chemotherapy including intrathecal chemotherapy at City of Hope for six months. The cause of lymphoma was prior chemotherapy from 2008 for breast cancer. In 2013, Gujral was in remission from both cancers.

In 2008, Gujral was treated for early stage, invasive breast cancer. She underwent surgery and chemotherapy. She hosts Thrive! With Namrata, a panel based show with cancer survivors on the Thrive Channel. She is featured in Uniglobe Entertainment's cancer docu-drama titled 1 a Minute released in 600 theaters. This is the largest release to date for a cancer-related film in cinema history. The docudrama is directed and produced by Gujral and also stars breast cancer survivors Olivia Newton-John, Diahann Carroll, Melissa Etheridge, Mumtaz, Jaclyn Smith and cancer survivors Lisa Ray, Barbara Mori and cancer treatment advocates Deepak Chopra, William Baldwin, Daniel Baldwin, Priya Dutt and Nancy Brinker. This marked Gujral's directorial debut.

Music
Gujral made her singing debut with the single "Dancin' In The Clouds", an American country rock meets Bollywood style duet, with country star Steve Azar, currently playing on Country Music Television. The single also features on MTV and VH1. Hollywood composer Jay Ferguson of Spirit and Jo Jo Gunne fame produced the single, reportedly making her the first American artist with Eastern roots to be featured on CMT.

Awards
For her role as Saira Ahmed on the CBS series Family Law, Gujral, along with co-stars Tony Danza and Kathleen Quinlan, were Columbia TriStar's official nomination for the 2002 Emmy Awards.

Filmography
 STILL (2022)
 Finding Match (2023)
 America's Forgotten 2 (2021)
 America's Forgotten (2020) 

 5 Weddings (2018)
 Destination Survival (2016)
 You Can Thrive (2016)
 Ultimate Survivor (2015)
 Thrive! With Namrata (2014)
 1 a Minute (2010)
 Americanizing Shelley (2007)
 Kaante (2002)
 House of Sand and Fog (2003)
 Mitsein (2009)
 The Agency CBS – (2001–2002)
 Passions NBC – (2001–2005)
 Family Law (2001)
 Dragnet (2004)
 Training Day'' (2001)

Music videos

References

External links

 Platform Magazine
 Mtv.com
 
 
 Namrata Singh Gujral on Americanizing Shelley
 

1976 births
Living people
American film actresses
American television actresses
American Sikhs
Indian emigrants to the United States
University of West Florida alumni
People from Dharamshala
American people of Portuguese descent
American people of Punjabi descent
American people of Tibetan descent
American actresses of Indian descent
Actresses from Himachal Pradesh
21st-century American women